Albert Lee Harjo (1937 – 2019), born in the Muscogee (Creek) Nation in Hanna, Oklahoma, was a fullblood Muscogee artist.

Education 
Harjo was born on September 25, 1937, in Hanna, Oklahoma, on the Muscogee Indian Reservation. He attended Jones Academy in Hartshorne, Oklahoma then later Chilocco Indian Agricultural School, just north of Ponca City, Oklahoma. After graduating with a high school diploma from Chilocco, Harjo enlisted and served in the United States Marine Corps. He was honorably discharged in 1959.

Art career 
Harjo's subject matter derived from his own life experiences as well those of neighbors, friends and family. Albert painted in the Bacone school, a Flatstyle of painting defined by Southeaster tribal artists active at Bacone College. His paintings used colors and multiple contour lines to define figures and shapes, as opposed to three-dimensional perspective or shading. He worked in distemper and watercolor.

Harjo exhibited his work at the Five Civilized Tribes Museum, Red Earth Festival, Creek Council House Museum, and the Philbrook Museum of Art. He also contributed his art work for causes such as the Red Cross and Native American bone marrow recruitment.

Harjo's paintings can be found in museums, galleries, and private collections throughout Eastern Oklahoma, the United States, and abroad.

Death 
Harjo died on September 6, 2019

References 

1937 births
Living people
Muscogee (Creek) Nation people
United States Marines
People from McIntosh County, Oklahoma
Artists from Oklahoma
Native American painters
People from Hartshorne, Oklahoma
20th-century Native Americans
21st-century Native Americans